= Latin American and Caribbean Network of Sites of Memory =

The Latin American and Caribbean Network of Sites of Memory (RESLAC, for its initials in Spanish) is an organization whose mission is to promote democracy and the observance of human rights in Latin America and the Caribbean through the recovery, construction and dissemination of collective memories about serious human rights violations and resistance, to achieve truth, justice, reparation and non-repetition measures. The network brings together 44 institutions from 12 countries (Argentina, Brazil, Chile, Colombia, El Salvador, Guatemala, Haiti, Mexico, Paraguay, Peru, the Dominican Republic and Uruguay). Globally, it is one of the seven regional networks that make up the International Coalition of Sites of Conscience, which has more than 275 members in 65 countries.

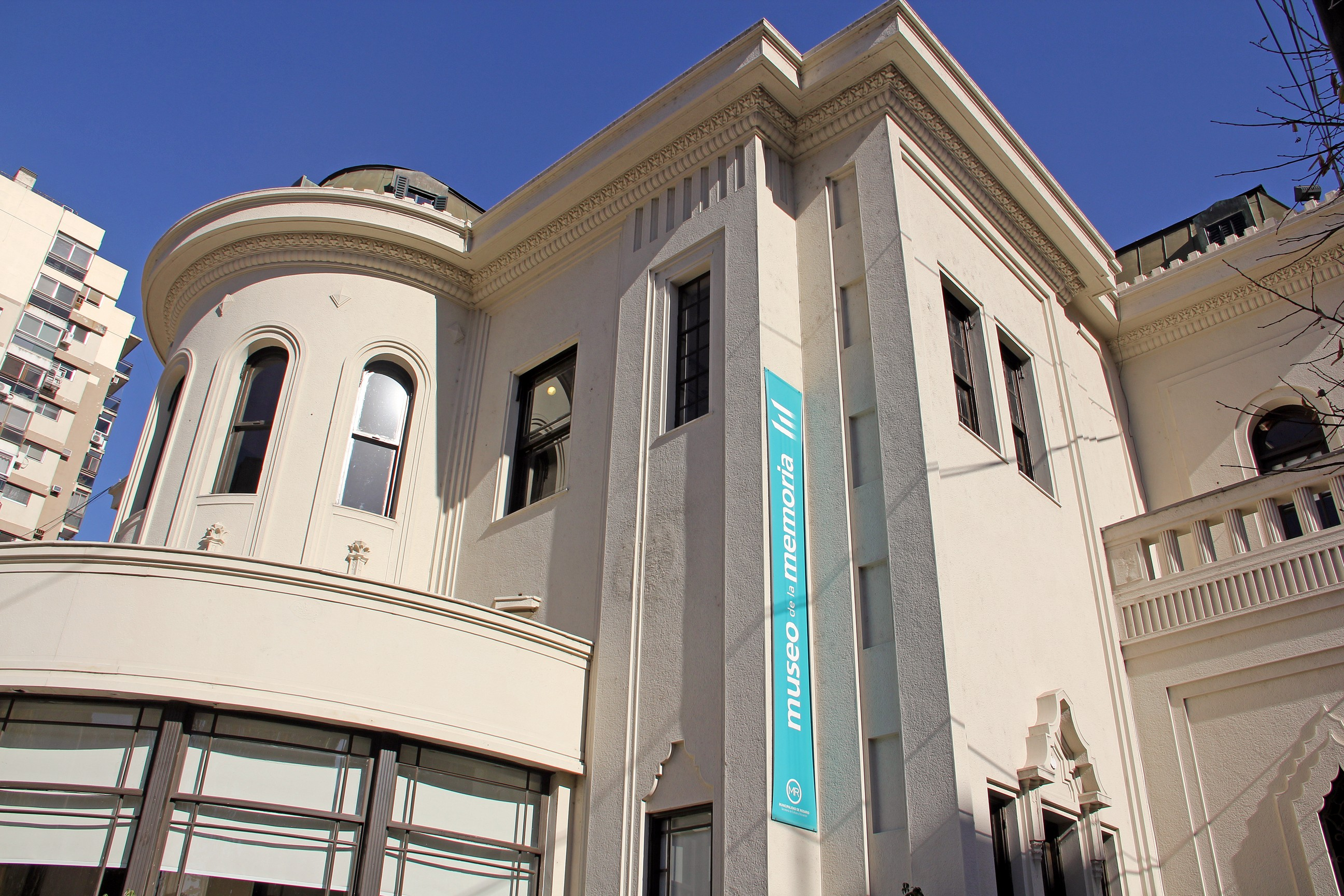
Memory Museum from Rosario, Argentina. RESLAC member.

RESLAC is made up of various initiatives that can be historical sites, museums, memorials, research centers, archives or territorial organizations. The network is linked by common interests in the defense of human rights. In each of them a clear link is established between past, present and future. Each of these institutions develops programs and projects that, in different ways, seek to influence their societies to build the ideal of “Never Again” (Nunca Más in Spanish) to violence and state terrorism. In this sense, they promote communication actions; investigation; formal and non-formal educational programs; preservation and enhancement of archives and collections.

== Projects and activities ==
RESLAC produces materials, audiovisuals, educational resources, exhibitions, reports, which are accessible on its website. Every year the network carries out a meeting in which axis of work and projects are agreed and developed year by year. These projects are carried out jointly among sites, for example the exhibition "Transiciones, de las dictaduras a las democracias en América Latina" (Transitions, from dictatorships to democracies in Latin America, in English) which was created in 2010 and was exhibited in many sites of the network..

The fist meeting of the network was in June 2006 with: "Public Use of Historic Sites for the Transmission of Memory", held in Buenos Aires, Argentina. In 2019, the XII meeting was held in San Pablo, Brazil, which sought to work mainly with the Truth Commissions of the region, their historical role, legacy and recommendations not addressed in the present.
